Bartlesville High School is a public high school located in Bartlesville, Oklahoma.  Built in 1939, it was originally called College High School, and until 1950 housed a junior college as well as the high school. Its Streamline Moderne building was designed by Tulsa architect John Duncan Forsyth.  In 1982 Sooner High School and College High School unified to create Bartlesville High School at the former College High School site.  The first graduating class of Bartlesville High School was in 1983.

See also
 Bartlesville Public Schools

Notable people
 Markell Carter, NFL player
 Ree Drummond, blogger and TV cook
 Bud Adams, owner of the Tennessee Titans; enrolled Cherokee, grew up in Bartlesville.
 Forrest Bennett, Oklahoma State Representative
 A. J. Parker, NFL player

References

External links

Educational institutions established in 1940
Public high schools in Oklahoma
Bartlesville, Oklahoma
Streamline Moderne architecture in Oklahoma
Schools in Washington County, Oklahoma
1940 establishments in Oklahoma